Texas Music Revolution is a Texas Country Music festival that began in 1997 and has been running for the past 14 years. The festival is hosted by KHYI-95.3 FM The Range, and sponsored by many local Dallas/Ft. Worth businesses including Shiner Bock. The festival is traditionally (for the past 12 years) located at Southfork Ranch in Parker, TX.

In 2018, Texas Music Revolution or "TMR14" featured artists such as Merrol Ray, John David Kent, Walt Wilkins, Brandon Jenkins, and Hayes Carll.

References

External links 
 

Music festivals in Texas